Propolis or bee glue is a resinous mixture that honey bees produce by mixing saliva and beeswax with exudate gathered from tree buds, sap flows, or other botanical sources. It is used as a sealant for unwanted open spaces in the beehive. Its color varies depending on its botanical source, with dark brown as the most common. Propolis is sticky at and above , while at lower temperatures it becomes hard and brittle.

When foraging, worker bees primarily harvest pollen and nectar, while also collecting water and plant resin necessary for the production of propolis. The chemical composition and nature of propolis depend on environmental conditions and harvested resources.

Types
Mixed types of propolis found in European countries with a moderate climate include two or more sources of plant resins (plant species) identified by composition, such as aspen, Mediterranean, poplar, Pacific, Brazilian green, Brazilian red, and Mangifera types of propolis.

Purpose
 
Bees seal the beehive with propolis to protect the colony from the elements, such as rain and cold winter drafts.

Propolis functions may include:
Reinforce the structural stability and reduce vibration
Provide improved thermal insulation to the hive and reduce water loss
Provides protection from pathogens, via anti-fungal and antibacterial properties
Make the hive more defensible against parasites and predators by narrowing the existing entrance (in wild colonies) to a single "choke point"
Mitigate putrefaction within the hive. Bees usually carry waste out of and away from the hive. However, if a small lizard or mouse, for example, finds its way into the hive and dies there, bees may be unable to carry it out through the hive entrance. In that case, they would attempt instead to seal the carcass in propolis, essentially mummifying it and making it odorless and harmless.

Composition

The composition of propolis varies from hive to hive, from district to district, and from season to season. Normally, it is dark brown in color, but it can be found in green, red, black, and white hues, depending on the sources of resin found in the particular hive area. Honey bees are opportunists, gathering what they need from available sources, and detailed analyses show that the chemical composition of propolis varies considerably from region to region, along with the vegetation. In northern temperate climates, for example, bees collect resins from trees, such as poplars and conifers (the biological role of resin in trees is to seal wounds and defend against bacteria, fungi, and insects). "Typical" northern temperate propolis has approximately 50 constituents, primarily resins and vegetable balsams (50%), waxes (30%), essential oils (10%), and pollen (5%). An analysis of propolis from Henan, China found sinapinic acid, isoferulic acid, caffeic acid, and chrysin.

In neotropical regions, in addition to a large variety of trees, bees may also gather resin from flowers in the genera Clusia and Dalechampia, which are the only known plant genera that produce floral resins to attract pollinators. Clusia resin contains polyprenylated benzophenones. In some areas of Chile and Argentina Andean valleys, propolis contains viscidone, a terpene from Baccharis shrubs, and prenylated acids, such as 4-hydroxy-3,5-diprenyl cinnamic acid.

Overall, flavonoids, phenolic acids, and phenolic aldehydes are common constituents, while coumarins, stilbenes, and lignans are less common.

Traditional medicine 
Propolis has been used in traditional medicine, with insufficient evidence to rate its effectiveness in the treatment of any illnesses.

Other uses

Musical instruments
Propolis is used by some string instrument makers (violin, viola, cello, and bass) as a varnish ingredient. A tincture of propolis may be used to seal the surface of newly made violin family bridges, and may be used in the maintenance of the bores of pan flute tubes. 

Claims that Antonio Stradivari used propolis in the varnish of his instruments were disproven in 2009.

References

External links

 

Beekeeping
Bee products
Traditional medicine
Xanthine oxidase inhibitors